Robert Arnold Schürhoff Martineau (22 August 1913 – 28 June 1999) was a British bishop who was the first Bishop of Huntingdon and who was later translated to Blackburn.

Born in Birmingham and educated at King Edward's School and Trinity Hall, Cambridge, he was ordained in 1938. His first post was as a curate at Melksham after which he was a World War II chaplain in the RAFVR.

When peace returned he became Vicar of Ovenden, Halifax, and then Allerton, Merseyside, before his ordination to the episcopate.

He died in Denbigh, Clwyd.

References

1913 births
1999 deaths
People educated at King Edward's School, Birmingham
Alumni of Trinity Hall, Cambridge
Royal Air Force Volunteer Reserve personnel of World War II
Bishops of Huntingdon
Bishops of Blackburn
People from Birmingham, West Midlands
Royal Air Force chaplains
World War II chaplains
20th-century Church of England bishops